Social Catfish is an online investigation service based in Murrieta, California. The company aims to help users avoid internet fraud like romance scams by providing online identity verification. Their website and app allows users to run background checks including social searches (names, emails, usernames, and phone numbers) and reverse image searches. The service specializes in determining if a person has been caught on other websites catfishing people. Its user interface is similar to other sites that promise personal information will be revealed, only disclosing the cost and payment information after a lengthy staged series of screens purportedly searching the entire internet for the requested information.

History 
The company initially started as a blog to educate people about online scams and catfishing. Today, Social Catfish is a multifaceted investigation tool with the option to run criminal background checks.

Social Catfish has been recognized in the media by publications such as Reuters, USA Today, and others for its ability to detect catfish.

They has been nominated in the Inc. 5000 awards and were named the 118th fastest growing company in America. The founder of Social Catfish, David McClellan, was a semi-finalist for the Spirit Awards in both 2019 and 2021 for best service based entrepreneur within the inland empire.

Technology 
One of the services that Social Catfish provides is a reverse image search engine. The data delivered after conducting a search is aggregated based on public data and profiles from various platforms including social media profiles. Their website is controlled and operated from their offices and facilities within the United States.

Social Catfish also employs a members-only group on Facebook. Within the page people can post and inform of scammer profiles they may have encountered online or scenarios they have experienced with scammers to make others aware of potential harm.

They also have an alliance with the Responsible Data Alliance which enhances the privacy settings within the webpage to protect users.

References 

Search engine software
American websites